(also written as ) is a type of Sake in which Ash is mixed into the brewing mash. It is drank as a new years spiced sake

See Also 

 Omiki
 Doburoku Matsuri
 Miki (Okinawa)

References

Bibliography 

 小泉武夫・角田潔和・鈴木昌治『酒学入門』講談社サイエンティフィク 1998年 ISBN 4-06-153714-8

External Links 

 瑞鷹株式会社（赤酒とは）
 東酒造株式会社（鹿児島の地酒）
 米田酒造株式会社（島根の地伝酒）
Japanese condiments
Sake
Pages with unreviewed translations